WIKG (92.1 FM) is a radio station licensed to Mercersburg, Pennsylvania, serving the Hagerstown, Maryland, area.

In late-September 2019, the station dropped its contemporary hit radio format and began stunting with Christmas music. On September 30, 2019, the station changed its calls from WNUZ to WIKG, and switched to classic hits as "92.1 The Goat."

References

External links

IKG
Classic hits radio stations in the United States